Really Bad Chess (stylized as really bad chess) is a mobile video game developed by Zach Gage. It was released on October 13, 2016 for iOS, with a version for Android released in May 2017. The game is based on the original game of chess but contains rearranged boards.

Gameplay

Really Bad Chess is played using a normal chess board, but with each player given one king and 15 other pieces selected at random based on the player's skill level. The pieces, moves, and goal are identical to the original game. Because of the rearranged pieces, players cannot use typical chess opening moves. Unlike in standard chess, in Really Bad Chess there are no draws: a stalemated player loses the game, and no draws can be claimed for reasons such as threefold repetition. As such, the game does not end when only the kings remain.

Development
Really Bad Chess was developed by Zach Gage, the developer behind the 2015 solitaire mobile game Sage Solitaire. The game was released on October 13, 2016, for iOS devices. Some players have reported stability issues when playing the game. A port for Android, produced by Noodlecake Studios, was released in May 2017.

Reception
Stephen Totilo of video game news site Kotaku recommended the game to those with an iPhone because though he doesn't "care for chess", he enjoyed playing it. Rob Funnell of mobile gaming site TouchArcade awarded the game a 5/5 rating and said the game turns the "mundane task of learning chess into an extremely enjoyable experience".

Reviewers thought the game would be good for helping newer and more inexperienced chess players learn how the game works. Funnell believed Really Bad Chess was a good way for new players and chess veterans to learn how to understand chess, and eventually become better at the game through learning how to "read the board". Prior to release, Emma Kidwell of Kill Screen said the game "should be great for beginners to learn about the joy of landing a checkmate without having to study openings".

See also
 Rules of chess
 Chess960

References

Further reading
 https://www.theverge.com/2016/10/13/13262994/really-bad-chess-zach-gage-iphone-ipad
 http://www.slate.com/articles/technology/gaming/2016/10/really_bad_chess_proves_that_games_don_t_need_to_be_fair.html

External links
 

2016 video games
Android (operating system) games
IOS games
Noodlecake Games games
Single-player video games
Video games designed by Zach Gage
Video games developed in the United States